The Women's individual pursuit at the 2012 UCI Track Cycling World Championships was held on April 8. 22 athletes participated in the contest. After the qualification, the fastest 2 riders advanced to the Final and the 3rd and 4th fastest riders raced for the bronze medal.

Medalists

Results

Qualifying
The qualifying was held at 15:00.

Finals
The finals were held at 19:00.

Small Final

Final

References

2012 UCI Track Cycling World Championships
UCI Track Cycling World Championships – Women's individual pursuit